São João de Iracema is a municipality in the state of São Paulo in Brazil. The population is 1,932 (2020 est.) in an area of 178 km². The elevation is 508 m.

References

Municipalities in São Paulo (state)